Bengt Jönsson (born August 29, 1958 in Klippan, Sweden) is a trainer in athletics. He trained world champion high jumper Kajsa Bergqvist in Turebergs FK for many years, and Jönsson influenced her to focus on high jump only.

References

1958 births
Living people
Swedish athletics coaches
People from Klippan Municipality
Sportspeople from Skåne County